Conasprella tayrona is a species of sea snail, a marine gastropod mollusc in the family Conidae, the cone snails, cone shells or cones.

Distribution
This marine species occurs in the Caribbean Sea off Colombia.

References

Petuch E.J., Berschauer D.P. & Poremski A. (2017). New species of Jaspidiconus (Conidae: Conilithinae) from the Carolinian and Caribbean Molluscan Provinces. The Festivus. 49(3): 237–246.

tayrona
Gastropods described in 2017